Livia Pelin (born 29 January 1966) is a Romanian luger. She competed in the women's singles event at the 1988 Winter Olympics.

References

1966 births
Living people
Romanian female lugers
Olympic lugers of Romania
Lugers at the 1988 Winter Olympics
Place of birth missing (living people)